100 Grad Festival is a theatre festival in Berlin, Germany.

Theatre festivals in Berlin
2003 establishments in Germany
Festivals established in 2003